The following are the national records in speed skating in Belarus maintained by the Skating Union of Belarus.

Men

Women

References

National records in speed skating
Speed skating-related lists
Speed skating
Records
Speed skating